Hannah Rachel Verbermacher (1805–1888), also known as the Maiden of Ludomir, the Maiden of Ludmir, the Ludmirer Moyd (in Yiddish), or HaBetula miLudmir (הבתולה מלודמיר in Hebrew), was the only independent female Rebbe in the history of the Hasidic movement.

Biography
Hannah Rachel Verbermacher was born in the early nineteenth century in the shtetl of Ludmir, Volhynia, region of modern-day Ukraine to Hasidic parents. Her father, Monesh Verbermacher, was a devotee of Rabbi Mordechai Twersky, known as the "Maggid of Chernobyl", as well as a wealthy businessman. He provided an extensive education for his only daughter, which included many fields of Torah study.

She appears not to have been a remarkable child, but underwent a transformation in her late teens. Declining marriage, she started to fulfill all the commandments, including those not incumbent among women, and increased her Torah study. She gained fame as a scholar and holy woman with powers to perform miracles.

As her fame grew she assumed functions generally reserved for Hasidic Rebbes, such as receiving audiences and accepting kvitlach (prayer request notes), and to preside over a Tish (the traditional Sabbath meal in the company of one's Hasidim) at which she would offer Torah teachings and pass shirayim (leftovers from a Rebbe's meal), although many accounts say that she did so from behind a screen out of modesty.

However, she remained an anomaly and had to withstand strong opposition from the fiercely traditional Hasidic community, who were made ill at ease by this unusual woman. At some point the pressure for her to refrain from her activities grew strong, and her father asked her to consult with his Rebbe, Mordechai Twersky, the Maggid of Chernobyl, on the matter. The Maggid convinced her to discontinue her unusual behavior, and encouraged her to marry and assume the traditional role for Hasidic women.

After the visit to the Rebbe, Hannah Rachel temporarily halted her activities as a Hasidic leader and teacher. She even married, although it is disputed how long the marriage lasted.

Later she immigrated to Ottoman Palestine and settled in Jerusalem. There she attracted a small group of followers. On Shabbat afternoons, they would come to hear her recite words of Torah, and on Rosh Chodesh she would accompany them to Rachel's Tomb for prayer. She died on 22 Tammuz, and is buried on the Mount of Olives.

See also
Timeline of women rabbis

Notes

References

Further reading
 The Maiden of Ludmir: A Jewish Holy Woman and Her World by Nathaniel Deutsch (University of California Press) 
 They Called Her Rebbe: The Maiden of Ludomir by Gershon Winkler (Israel Book Shop Press) 
 From Sarah to Sarah: And Other Fascinating Jewish Women Both Famous and Forgotten by S. Feldbrand (Lishmoa Lilmod U'Lelamed)

External links
 Khane-Rokhl Webermakher: The Maiden of Ludmir, Video Lecture by Dr. Henry Abramson

19th-century Jews
Hasidic rebbes
Burials at the Jewish cemetery on the Mount of Olives
Female religious leaders
Ukrainian Jewish religious leaders
1805 births
1888 deaths
Women rabbis and Torah scholars
Women mystics
People from Volodymyr-Volynskyi